Lionel Barrie Woodward,  (born 9 October 1942) is a retired senior Australian public servant.

Life and career
Woodward was born in Sydney on 9 October 1942.

In 1982, Woodward was appointed a Deputy Secretary in the Department of Immigration and Ethnic Affairs, where he remained until 1985. From 1985 to 1989, Woodward was a Deputy Secretary in the Department of Defence.
Between March 1989 and April 1994, Woodward was the Secretary of the Department of Veterans' Affairs.

Woodward was the Chief Executive Director of the Australian Customs Service for over a decade, between 1994 and 2005.

Awards
Woodward was made an Officer of the Order of Australia in January 1995. In 2001, he was awarded the Centenary Medal for service as Comptroller General and later Chief Executive Officer, Australian Customs Service.

References

1942 births
Living people
Australian National University alumni
Officers of the Order of Australia
Recipients of the Centenary Medal
Secretaries of the Australian Government Veterans' Affairs Department